Ramian County is in Golestan province, Iran. The capital of the county is the city of Ramian. At the 2006 census, the county's population was 81,866 in 19,579 households. The following census in 2011 counted 85,324 people in 23,598 households. At the 2016 census, the county's population was 86,210 in 25,579 households.

Administrative divisions

The population history and structural changes of Ramian County's administrative divisions over three consecutive censuses are shown in the following table. The latest census shows two districts, four rural districts, and four cities.

References

 

Counties of Golestan Province